Pumawiri (Hispanicized spelling Pumahuiri) is a mountain in the Andes of Peru, about  high. It is situated in the Ayacucho Region, Parinacochas Province, Coracora District.

References 

Mountains of Peru
Mountains of Ayacucho Region